Shaanxi is a province of China that has a long history of folk music. The Shaanxi Music and Dance Troupe has toured across the world; there is also a Shaanxi Provincial Song and Dance Ensemble that performs historical music from the Tang Dynasty.

Qinqiang is the most well-known opera style from Shaanxi, said to date back to the Qin emperor during the Tang dynasty.  Folk dances from Shaanxi include the tichangzi, Ansai waist drum dance and the grand yangko.

Shaanxi's folk songs include "Lan Huahua" (Blue Flower), and come in more than twenty styles, including most commonly xiaodiao and xintianyou (short, improvised pastoral songs).  A folk singer from the province, He Yutang, was discovered Li Yarong, also a singer and sculptor and journalist; Yarong made a music video around one of Yutang's songs, and the result won second place in the Music Video Awards.  Wang Xiangrong is the most widely known singer of Shaanxi folk music.

More recently, modern Chinese rock emerged from the Northwest Wind style folk song of Shaanxi.

See also
Xi'an guyue

References

Shaanxi
Culture in Shaanxi